Jim Corrigan is the name of three fictional characters that have appeared in numerous comic books published by DC Comics.

The first Corrigan initially appeared in More Fun Comics #52 (February 1940), a deceased cop acting as host to the cosmic entity the Spectre, and was created by Jerry Siegel and Bernard Baily.

The second Jim Corrigan was an African-American policeman who has no relation with the original character, first appeared in Superman's Pal Jimmy Olsen #149 (May 1972). The character was created by John Albano and José Delbo. He later became a regular supporting character in Black Lightning beginning with #4.

The third Jim Corrigan appeared years later in issue #12 of Gotham Central, a series about the Gotham City Police Department. The character, created by Greg Rucka, Ed Brubaker, and Michael Lark although similar to the first Corrigan in being a police detective, again is not related to him and served as a red herring of who would become the new Spectre. This Corrigan is later revealed to be a corrupt, self-serving malefactor who murders his colleague Crispus Allen; Allen then becomes the host to the Spectre.

Jim Corrigan appeared in a live-action portrayal by Emmett J. Scanlan in the television series Constantine. Stephen Lobo also portrayed the character in the Arrowverse crossover Crisis on Infinite Earths.

Fictional character biography

More Fun Comics and All-Star Comics

Jim Corrigan began his career as the Spectre in the early 1940s, when the hard-boiled police detective was murdered.  Put into cement and thrown into the water by crime-boss Gat Benson, Jim Corrigan's soul left his body and went on towards the afterlife.  Instead of going into Heaven, his spirit refused to pass into the afterlife, and his rage was heard by the archangel Michael, who bonded Jim's spirit to the spirit of God's vengeance, the Spectre. He was condemned to return to Earth for sixty years of punishing wrongdoings.

As the Spectre, Jim Corrigan returned to the mortal plane as a partial human, where he proceeded to rain his vengeance on Gat Benson and his accomplices. In the process however, Jim's fiancée, Clarice Winston, was mortally wounded. Using his newfound power, he was able to return Clarice to life, but later ended their relationship in order to spare her any further pain.  He also broke off with his partner, and became more of a lone agent, trying to distance himself from his mortal ties, although he retained his job on the police force.

As the popularity of superhero comics began to decline in the mid-1940s, the Spectre suffered as a result. He was reduced to playing the role of "guardian angel" to a bumbling character called "Percival Popp, the Super Cop." Introduced in #74, December 1941 (aside from a head-shot in a one-panel preview at the end of #73's Spectre story), he was a would-be civilian sleuth who, in his words, latched onto Corrigan "of all the detectives on the force because it appeared to me that you are the most intelligent of the lot! You and I ought to be an unbeatable combination, sir!" In the following story, the Voice allowed the physical body of Jim Corrigan, still in cement at the bottom of the river, to be resurrected with the Ring of Life, which had helped the Spectre out of some jams in a few previous stories. The Ghostly Guardian found that he could emerge from Corrigan and maintain a separate existence.  In More Fun #90, April 1943, Jim Corrigan per se was completely removed from the feature — he enlisted in the military for World War II service — and the Spectre's reduction to guardian angel status was complete; he even became invisible to everybody but Percy.

As the Spectre, Jim Corrigan ran with the JSA, but he was replaced in 1944, and afterwards Jim Corrigan and the Spectre disappeared from the DC Universe for more than 20 years.

Spectre
When the Spectre was revived in Showcase #60, (January–February 1966), Jim Corrigan played an important part, as editor Julius Schwartz and writer Gardner Fox made significant use of the resurrection of Corrigan's body depicted back in More Fun Comics #75. While the Ghostly Guardian crossed from one mystical plane of existence to another fighting occult menaces, Corrigan, now a captain of Gateway City's police force, was fighting his own battles against a more mundane criminal element. However, Corrigan often got involved in the Spectre's conflicts. In that first story, another spirit, named Azmodus, took possession of a small-time criminal, and while the two astral beings engaged in cosmic combat, the two mortal men slugged it out.

In Showcase #64, September–October 1966, when the Spectre took possession of the body of a dying man, Ace Chance, to preserve its spark of life after his soul had departed, that spirit found the living but soulless Corrigan and entered him. With Chance's physical form hospitalized and on life-support, the Spectre found he could not re-enter Jim. Ace had no desire to give up this body and began romancing heiress Mona Marcy. After Chance was put back into his proper body, Corrigan wondered what he was going to do about Mona, who had no idea who she had really been dating. In fact, a year later the Spectre was awarded his own comic, and in #2 (January–February 1968), Jim asks his astral alter ego for a little privacy, as he has a date with Mona.

While she was not mentioned again, things became more involved for Corrigan. This series established that prolonged separation from his corporeal body diminished the Spectre's energies, and more than once, Jim's will power could keep his spirit form from entering him. The latter instance found Corrigan pinned down by criminals he was after, and his demands for the Spectre's help resulted in the tired spirit acting harshly and hurting an innocent man in the vicinity. Shortly after this, the Spectre was chained to the Journal of Judgment and Corrigan made no more appearances in this era.

Bronze Age
The next time Jim Corrigan was seen was in the brief but controversial Spectre series in Adventure Comics #431–440 (March–April 1974 – July–August 1975). Here, writer Michael Fleisher, ably abetted by atmospheric art from Jim Aparo (Frank Thorne and Ernie Chan spelled him on the pencils once and twice, respectively, when his schedule became too tight), took the Spectre back to his earliest days. As in the first two years in More Fun Comics, the hero and his civilian identity were simply two guises of the same entity. Nevertheless, Corrigan's "life" did get interesting. Now a lieutenant in New York City, Jim was investigating the murder of wealthy businessman Adrian Sterling and met the victim's daughter Gwen. Despite his assertions that romance was out of the question for him, she fell in love with Corrigan. In saving her life from her father's murderer, he had to reveal his true nature. Gwen fell under the influence of a medium, told him about Corrigan's situation, and asked him if he could restore the detective to life. Unfortunately, he was a con artist that the department, and Corrigan in particular, were investigating, and he took advantage of what he presumed was the woman's mental illness to trap and kill Corrigan. As he was already dead, the plan backfired horribly.

Not long later, a reporter named Earl Crawford noticed the number of gruesome finishes that many local criminals had been meeting recently and suspected a connection. By lying to his editor as to just what he had in mind, he arranged an assignment to ride around with a police criminal investigator and, of all people, Lt. Jim Corrigan was the lucky cop. Crawford soon saw the Spectre in action for himself. Despite being a ghost, Corrigan returned Gwen's feelings and pleaded into the night in his dark apartment for a reprieve. Without telling him, the Voice granted the request and he awoke the next morning a mortal man. Corrigan did not realize this until he was shot in the line of duty a few hours later. Once out of the hospital, he proposed to Gwen, who promptly accepted. However, Corrigan was again murdered by criminals and again sent back to Earth by the Voice as the Spectre. He took vengeance upon his killers, then appeared to Gwen to give her the news.

A direct follow-up to this run appeared a few years later as a three-issue story arc in the Dr. Thirteen the Ghost-Breaker series that Paul Kupperberg was writing in Ghosts #97–99 (February–April 1981). Here, the Spectre was still slaughtering particularly brutal criminals and Earl Crawford was still looking for a way to stop the supernatural entity that he knew was responsible, but now Dr. Thirteen was trying to prove he was something normal. Even though Earl and Terry came up with the idea that Lt. Jim Corrigan was somehow connected to the killings, his appearances here were brief and perfunctory.

Another sequel to the Adventure run was published seven years later. A deluxe format miniseries, Wrath of the Spectre, reprinted the original 10 stories in its first three issues, and in its fourth presented, newly drawn by Jim Aparo and various inkers, three stories that had been written by Michael Fleisher in 1975 but left on the proverbial shelf when the series was replaced with Aquaman (even though Fleisher was already on the record in 1980 as having left just two stories). Here, Earl Crawford is charged with murdering a criminal that was actually eliminated by the Spectre, but found not guilty by reason of insanity, and committed to an asylum. Corrigan demonstrates compassion, first by having a disguised Gwen Sterling visit and comfort him, then by using the powers of the Spectre to clear him.

Jim Corrigan also appeared in each of the Spectre's three The Brave and the Bold team-ups with Batman during this era, one of which included fighting against the evil sorcerer Wa'arzen (issues #116 (December 1974-January 1975), 180 (November 1981) and 199 (June 1983)). One other instance is worth noting: in the revived All Star Comics, Jim Corrigan, this time an Inspector with the Gotham City P.D., was seen in issue #70 (January–February 1978).

Spectre (vol. 2)

Among the many changes made to DC Comics' characters during the later half of the 1980s (following the 12-issue miniseries Crisis on Infinite Earths), the Spectre (and thereby Jim Corrigan) was largely depowered. First, in the conclusion to Alan Moore's Swamp Thing storyline "American Gothic", the Spectre was defeated by evil incarnate as it advances to destroy Heaven. Finally, the Spectre, in Last Days of the Justice Society of America, failed to resolve the situation and is punished by God for his failure. Under the authorship of Doug Moench, he became nearly a generic mystical figure, with Corrigan joining an occult detective agency.

This was largely notable because now, Jim Corrigan and the Spectre became two separate entities (although the body of Jim Corrigan was, in fact, a piece of the Spectre's ectoplasm, as later revealed). The body of Corrigan still served as a host to the Spectre, but the Spectre could move on his own separately for a whole day, afterwards needing to return to Corrigan's body to replenish his energy. This allowed for Corrigan to actually team up with the Spectre (rather than the two being one), in essence splitting the 'workload' in two, since one could handle research and the other could get the job done. It also allowed for Corrigan to become a full-fledged detective again.

Nonetheless, if the two were separated for too long, it would spell disaster for both, and therefore Madame Xanadu, who was not only instrumental in returning the Spectre to Earth (and 'separating' Jim Corrigan from him) but also held her place of operations in the same building as Corrigan's agency, introduced a guardian for Corrigan. The attractive young woman Kim Liang became not only Jim's secretary, but also a caretaker, herself a separated piece of Xanadu's soul (although this was unknown to her at the time). The importance of Xanadu in these actions later set the stage for her role in Corrigan's life when John Ostrander set up a new Spectre title.

Spectre (vol. 3)

#1-12
Jim Corrigan's status quo was changed when John Ostrander landed the job as writer to a new Spectre ongoing series. Jim Corrigan and the Spectre were now one once more and he had moved out of his agency. Throughout Ostrander's tenure, Jim Corrigan started to come into conflict with the Spectre as he started to grow as a person. He learned that his old methods no longer applied to the world he lived in and he was forced to make certain concessions.

Corrigan's transformation begins in the first few issues of the new volume. Corrigan meets Amy Beitermann, a social staff worker and Inspector Nate Kane, a friend of Amy. While investigating the old murder of a woman, Corrigan learns that although he is able to solve her murder, he is unable to understand the victim, whose ghost continues to wander the scene of her death. When Corrigan exchanges memories with Amy, she learns of his true purpose: "To confront and to comprehend evil", an element newly introduced by Ostrander. Amy serves as Corrigan's spiritual guide from then, until she is murdered by a serial killer in issue #12.

#13–26
Troubled, Jim Corrigan turns to the church, where he meets Father Richard Craemer (a character introduced by Ostrander in Suicide Squad), a somewhat unorthodox one at that though, often disagreeing with the church method. After Corrigan's confession, Craemer gives his advice, mentioning Vlatava, a country torn by civil war.

The Spectre razes the country of Vlatava and he concludes that in order to eradicate evil, he will need to destroy Earth. The Phantom Stranger gathers a group of mages to stop him and Madame Xanadu gathers the Israeli sorcerer Ramban (also a character Ostrander used in Suicide Squad) and Craemer.

The group, led by the Stranger, face an Eclipso-controlled Spectre while the other group reaches out to Corrigan's soul. Thanks to Craemer, Corrigan is able to reassert control of the Spectre and see the error of his ways. The archangel Michael appears, stating that Corrigan now finally truly can do his work as the Spectre. From then on, Craemer becomes a spiritual advisor to Jim Corrigan.

The Spectre, however, is deemed a threat to the American government, and with the help of a Professor Hazard is confronted by Superman, who holds the Spear of Destiny, the only weapon known to be able to hurt the Spectre. The Spectre is eventually able to defeat Superman and banish the Spear. Corrigan also learns that, unbeknownst to him, he has been keeping his old fiancé Clarice Winston alive with his powers. She is almost killed by her granddaughter Clarissa, and as punishment the Spectre switches their souls.

#27–36
Azmodus eventually returns and restores Clarissa Winston's (now trapped in her grandmother's body) youth. This body is still connected to the Spectre, and thereby Azmodus can tap into the Spectre's power. The Spectre confronts Azmodus, but is captured as he is shocked to learn that Azmodus is, in part, a previous host of the Spectre. His friends, most notably again Father Craemer and the reluctant Nate Kane, are able to free him and beat Azmodus, separating Caraka, the first host to the Spectre, from the demon he was bonded with. In order to defeat Azmodus, however, the Spectre is required to cut his lifeline to Clarice's body; he decides to switch again with her repentant granddaughter. As Clarice goes to Heaven, it is revealed that she was, in fact, Caraka's soulmate all along, and was attracted to Jim because of their similarities. After this ordeal, Jim Corrigan continues to serve as the Spectre, now once more a step closer to his redemption, with Craemer as his advisor.

In order to find his connection to humanity again, Jim Corrigan gets himself assigned as Nate Kane's partner, the two becoming a police duo. Eventually the Spectre is seduced by the demon Neron and Jim is allowed to go into Heaven, now separated from the Spectre, but he refuses. He retakes control of the Spectre, although he learns that he was not as much in control as he thought.

#37–50
Nate Kane is shot, and the two become involved in a plot concerning a mystical talisman that represents the iconic America. Near the end of that quest for the various broken pieces of the talisman, Nate Kane and Jim Corrigan are once again forced to grow closer after Jim has to enter Nate's body in order to heal himself after a short side-adventure in which he had to use his Spectre powers to keep the Earth alive during The Final Night.

During the course of the search for the talisman, Jim also comes to new insights, as he not only meets the spirit of his old childhood friend Lonetree, but is also confronted with the fact that he was a man of the 1930s. As a hardboiled no-nonsense cop in the 1930s, Corrigan was a different man faced with different situations.

Corrigan was finally able to see the current American world, including its segregation of the African Americans, the abuse of the Native Americans, but also the subjugation of women (and the connected witch-hunts) and other parts of America's past.

Ultimately, with the help of his friends, and various spirits that represent the spirit of America today, a new American talisman is created, and Jim Corrigan also finds himself starting to change into a different man, and what he believes to be a better man.

#51–62
As Nate Kane and Jim Corrigan share the body of Kane, Nate comes to experience certain memories of Corrigan's revolving around a murder case from the 1930s. Intrigued, Nate Kane investigates further and he comes upon facts that indicate that Jim Corrigan might have been a murderer before his involvement with the Spectre. Meanwhile, the Spectre grows more savage, among other things killing all of the guilty on death row in a New York jail. Craemer continues to try and guide him. Corrigan also learns of what Nate is doing and the two part ways. To atone for his murdering of the criminals in the New York jail, Corrigan helps to prove the innocence of the one man he did not kill, but loses control once more, killing a bunch of corrupt police officers. During this time, he also comes across the troubled Michael Holt, whom he influences to become the second Mr. Terrific.

The Spectre continues on his merciless way, dispensing justice on every guilty person that he comes across. He also finally meets Nate Kane and the woman he previously thought he had murdered. Trying to come to grips with his own sins as well as hers (she had killed her mother and tried to frame Corrigan for it), the woman's granddaughter mercy-killed her grandmother in fear of what the Spectre would do. Forced to judge her, Corrigan and the Spectre fight and decide that they will need the judgement of God on their own existence.

To their surprise, God has gone missing, as has Heaven. The two decide to work together and they visit various pantheons, as well as entering the Source Wall. Given only two cryptic messages, the Spectre demands to confront God. He is bombarded with the nature of God and becomes one with every particle in the universe. The experience again conflicts the Spectre and Corrigan, and pushed to the brink, they are ejected from the Source Wall. They then learn that the gap between the two has grown so wide that they can separate themselves. At the advice of Father Craemer, the two travel inside themselves and are eventually confronted by a seemingly crazy God who resembles Corrigan's father.

God assumed the form of Corrigan's father, a travelling preacher, because he was the most influential person during Jim Corrigan's youth. Jim's father tried to imprint his black and white view of good and evil on the young boy (usually through both physical and verbal abuse), even though he himself often gave into sin. Eventually the ruse is uncovered and it turns out that Jim has undergone his final test and is ready to leave the mantle of the Spectre.

With the help of the Spectre, Jim Corrigan's old (dead) body is given a proper burial and his funeral is attended by many superheroes and friends. Then Jim Corrigan relinquishes the Spectre, and as Father Craemer bids his last respects to his friend, from the heavens, a message is carved upon the formerly blank gravestone of Jim Corrigan, stating: "James Corrigan, servant of God".

Day of Judgment

Although Corrigan was laid to rest, the power of the Spectre was still in the world. During the miniseries Day of Judgment, the Spectre is controlled by the fallen angel Asmodel, who uses the Spectre's awesome might to freeze Hell and unleash hordes of demons upon the world.

In an effort to stop the Spectre, the magical heroes divide into groups, of which one is sent to collect the soul of Jim Corrigan so that he can reclaim the Spectre mantle. Amongst his old friends of the JSA and his love Amy in Heaven, Corrigan refuses to leave the afterlife to rejoin with the Spectre, stating that he is finally at peace and that his time in Heaven has sapped his will to the point that he would no longer be able to control the Spectre anyway. The heroes decide to respect Jim's wishes and they eventually recruited the soul of Hal Jordan from Purgatory to assume the mantle of the Spectre, the Spectre accepting Hal when he declares that he deserves to be punished for his actions in life. Corrigan later reappears to give Jordan his blessing.

During the recent resurrection of the Spirit King - due to Hal's attempts to turn the Spectre's role to one of redemption having weakened the Spectre's hold on the spirits that he had damned in the past - Father Craemer appeared to try and advise Hal Jordan on how to regain control of the spirit, saying that Jim Corrigan had sent him to help, but it was left unclear if he had actually been contacted by Jim Corrigan or if he simply meant that his experience with Jim had helped him recognise what was happening and inspired him to help for the sake of his friend.

The New 52
In September 2011, The New 52 rebooted DC's continuity. In this new timeline, Jim Corrigan is a Gotham City Police Detective whose fiancé was kidnapped. He is guided by the Phantom Stranger on the instructions of The Voice. He leads Jim Corrigan to the abandoned warehouse where she is being kept, but this turns out to be a trap. Jim Corrigan and his girlfriend are killed by the kidnappers and he is then transformed into the Spectre, who accuses the Phantom Stranger of betraying him. As the Spectre is about to attack the Phantom Stranger, The Voice intervenes and sends the Spectre off to inflict his wrath on those who are more deserving of the Spectre's wrath.

It is revealed that The Voice chose him, like he did the Stranger, to be "the mirror of his desire for justice" (though Corrigan believes in vengeance) and imbued him with divine powers. Jim returns to work as a police detective in Gotham City. The rage-filled Jim was performing his duties as the Spectre by practicing vengeance rather than justice, until the Phantom Stranger attacked his police precinct, convinced he was the one who kidnapped his family out of revenge. After exchanging blows physically and verbally, "The Voice" (God) himself intervened in the form of a Scottish Terrier (his sense of humor) and informed the Stranger of his mistake and set him on the right path. "The Voice" also set Corrigan straight on his duties and told him that he is meant to exact justice and not wrath.

In the "Watchmen" sequel "Doomsday Clock," Lois Lane finds a flash-drive among the mess while at the Daily Planet. It shows her footage of Spectre and the rest of the Justice Society.

In the pages of "The New Golden Age", Spectre was among the Justice Society members who partook in a group photo. When a Huntress from a possible future ended up in 1940, Spectre is among the Justice Society members that meet her. As Doctor Fate tries to read Huntress' mind about the threat in her future, Spectre is among those that are knocked down by the magical feedback.

Powers and abilities
As the Spectre, Jim has all the abilities of God, including, but not limited to, manipulation of time and space, manipulation of matter and energy, invulnerability, limitless strength, and reality alteration. Virtually anything he wishes to do to those he judges is possible. He has no discernible weakness other than needing a human host to be able to be a fair and impartial judge, although he has been tricked before by the Psycho-Pirate and Eclipso. The Spectre is immune to most damage, although he can be hurt by powerful magic. Though he is widely considered to be the most powerful superhero in terms of abilities, the Spectre does not harm the innocent (unless being tricked into doing so). The Spectre is usually immune to mind control effects.

Other characters named Jim Corrigan

Jim Corrigan (1970s)

An African American police officer based in Metropolis who worked with both Jimmy Olsen and Black Lightning. He first appeared in Superman's Pal Jimmy Olsen #149 (May 1972). He later became a regular supporting character in (vol. 1) of Black Lightning beginning with issue #4.

Jim Corrigan (2000s)

A Crime Scene Unit officer in the Gotham City Police Department, Jim Corrigan is, like so many of that city's police force, corrupt. He routinely abuses his position by selling crime scene memorabilia such as bullets, as well as more extravagant items lost by the city's colourful villains.

Although the Internal affairs division was aware of his activities, they could not interfere due to an explosive encounter between Corrigan and Renee Montoya, of the Major Crimes Unit, when Crispus Allen had been accused of murder.

Allen, who loathed the fact that Corrigan had gotten off due to Montoya's desire to protect him, had begun investigating Corrigan.  Just as his investigation began to bear fruit, however, Corrigan shot and killed Detective Allen.

This spurred the GCPD to arrest Corrigan, but unfortunately, the past incident with Montoya, along with a decent alibi, had given Corrigan the defense he needed to avoid both court and jail.

Montoya, who was blind with fury and had been slowly falling into a deep depression over the past few months, had finally snapped with the loss of Allen. She stormed into Corrigan's apartment and after knocking out his girlfriend, threatened to kill Corrigan by placing a gun in his mouth. The previously smug CSI officer broke down and tearfully began pleading Montoya to spare his life. Despite her thirst for vengeance, Montoya simply beats and let's him go and then resigned from the force.

In the final issue of the three-issue miniseries Crisis Aftermath: The Spectre, a miniseries about Crispus Allen dealing with his new role as the Spectre, it was revealed that Corrigan had spent the time after Montoya's attack drinking (Allen found him this way, but did not take vengeance on him — it was too easy and too personal), but one night upon stumbling into an alley, he was confronted by Allen's young son Mal and shot multiple times, killing him. Later stories instead identify Corrigan's killer as Mal's brother, Jacob Allen.

Other versions

Kingdom Come
In the four-issue Elseworlds miniseries Kingdom Come, The Spectre is just Jim Corrigan, a once-human soul imbued with angelic powers by God. In a near-apocalyptic world the Spectre takes a preacher named Norman McCay through the events of a possible future of the DC Universe. Here, Spectre is to determine who is responsible for an impending apocalyptic event. However, here his "faculties are not what they once were", and he is said to need an outside perspective to properly judge the events they witness.

A conversation between McCay and Deadman reveals that, with the passing of time, Corrigan has become further and further removed from humanity, now only wearing his cloak to cover an otherwise nude body (similar to Doctor Manhattan). He is reminded by McCay of his humanity to see things through the perspective as the man he once was and decides no one is to blame. Corrigan becomes a member of McCay's congregation and they become friends.

In the epilogue set in a superhero-themed restaurant, he expresses irritation that the meal named after him, the "Spectre Platter", is a mix of spinach and cottage cheese.

Vertigo
Police detective Jim Corrigan appeared in Sandman Mystery Theatre #42 (September 1996). As this was a Vertigo series, DC Universe canonicity is unclear.

In other media

Arrowverse
Variations of Jim Corrigan appear in TV series set in the Arrowverse:
 Corrigan appears in Constantine, portrayed by Emmett J. Scanlan. This version is a police officer from New Orleans.
 An alternate universe version of Corrigan from an unspecified Earth appears in the crossover event "Crisis on Infinite Earths", portrayed by Stephen Lobo. He passes the Spectre's power to Oliver Queen so he can save the multiverse from the Anti-Monitor.

Film
 Jim Corrigan / Spectre appears on a comic book cover depicted in Under the Hood.
 Jim Corrigan / Spectre appears in DC Showcase: The Spectre, voiced by Gary Cole.

Miscellaneous
 Jim Corrigan / Spectre appears in issue #37 of the Justice League Unlimited tie-in comic book.
 Jim Corrigan appears in the Injustice: Gods Among Us prequel comic. Sometime prior, he was "Jokerized" and left for dead in Arkham Asylum, allowing Mister Mxyzptlk to usurp him as the Spectre and aid Superman's Regime.

References

External links
 DCU Guide: Jim Corrigan I
 DCU Guide: Jim Corrigan II

Comics characters introduced in 1940
Comics characters introduced in 1972
Comics characters introduced in 2003
DC Comics characters with superhuman strength
DC Comics superheroes
DC Comics supervillains
Golden Age superheroes
Fictional American police detectives
Fictional ghosts
Fictional murderers
DC Comics undead characters
Fictional African-American people
Characters created by Jerry Siegel
Characters created by Ed Brubaker
Characters created by Greg Rucka
Gotham City Police Department officers